The nature reserve of Rehden Geest Moor is an extensive, open raised bog in the collective municipality of Rehden, in the county of Diepholz in Lower Saxony. It is a representative raised bog for the natural region known as the Diepholz Moor Depression (Diepholzer Moorniederung). According to GIS it covers an area of 1,736 hectares, but according to the conservation act, 1,786 hectares.

References

External links 

 Rehden Geest Moor
 

Geest
Bogs of Lower Saxony
Nature reserves in Lower Saxony
Diepholz (district)